Murtz Jaffer is a Canadian entertainment journalist. He hosted the reality television show Reality Obsessed that aired on TVTropolis and the Global Reality Channel in Canada. He served as a freelance producer with Entertainment Tonight Canada, Canada AM, CTV News Channel and Pop Life on CTV. He is the television editor of InsidePulse.com, a freelance contributor with the Toronto Star, and an associate producer with The Morning Show.

Career 
Jaffer began his career writing for The Sports Network at the age of 17. After reporting for the site from 1997–1998, Jaffer wrote for a variety of wrestling websites before deciding to launch his own internet property in 2001.

In 2002, Jaffer launched Survivor-Central, an online resource about Survivor just as he began studying at the University of Toronto. The site became one of only a handful of websites dedicated to the show. The site led to Jaffer developing a reputation as a Survivor expert.

In 2004, Jaffer merged Survivor-Central with InsidePulse.com, an entertainment website.

Jaffer graduated from Centennial College's post-graduate journalism program in 2003. He has worked at Entertainment Tonight Canada, the Toronto Sun, Z103.5, Virgin Radio 99.9 and volunteered at CTV.ca.  He has freelanced for the National Post and TV Guide Canada.

In 2007, he appeared in The New York Times for starting an anti-application Facebook group.

In 2008, Jaffer was recognized as one of Centennial College's Alumnus of Distinction award winners, becoming one of the award's youngest recipients.

Jaffer was the host and co-creator of Reality Obsessed which aired on the TVTropolis network in Canada. The show was a behind-the-scenes look at reality television and won a Gemini Award for 'Best Direction In A Reality Series' for its 'Ultimate Casting Tape' first-season episode.

In 2011, Jaffer received the 'Special Achievement In Reality Reporting Award' at the Reality Rocks convention in Los Angeles. Later that year Jaffer appeared as an extra on the season finale of Dan for Mayor on CTV.

In 2015, Jaffer worked as a freelance producer on the Canada AM morning program and served as a producer with CTV News Channel from 2016 to 2021.

In 2021, Jaffer began writing for the Toronto Star as a freelance contributor.

In 2022, Jaffer began working for Global News and The Morning Show as an associate producer.

Notes

External links
 Murtz Jaffer, InsidePulse.com Article archive
Murtz Jaffer's Television Show Reality Obsessed

Canadian television editors
Canadian television hosts
Living people
Centennial College alumni
Year of birth missing (living people)